Women Who Commit Adultery (German:Frauen, die die Ehe brechen) is a 1922 German silent film directed by and starring Bruno Eichgrün as the private detective Nick Carter. It was made as the sequel to The Passenger in the Straitjacket.

Cast
In alphabetical order

References

Bibliography

External links

1922 films
Films of the Weimar Republic
German silent feature films
Films directed by Bruno Eichgrün
German black-and-white films
Nick Carter (literary character)